Haute Dog is an American reality competition streaming television series that premiered on HBO Max on September 24, 2020.

Premise
Each episode follows three dog groomers as they compete in a series of challenges and find the best look for their dogs. Celebrity dog groomer Jess Rona provides commentary and judges, alongside Robin Thede. Matt Rogers hosts.

Production
Principal photography wrapped in August 2020 in Simi Valley, California, following safety protocols and guidelines due to the COVID-19 pandemic.

References

External links 
 Haute Dog on HBO Max
 

HBO Max original programming
Television shows about dogs
2020 American television series debuts
2020 American television series endings
2020s American reality television series
Reality web series
Television shows filmed in California
Reality competition television series